The sixth season of the American television sitcom New Girl premiered on Fox on September 20, 2016, at 8:30pm (Eastern), and concluded on April 4, 2017. During the series, it moved to 8:00pm (Eastern) in early 2017.

Developed by Elizabeth Meriwether under the working title Chicks & Dicks, the series revolves around offbeat teacher Jess (Zooey Deschanel) after her moving into an LA loft with three men, Nick (Jake Johnson), Schmidt (Max Greenfield), and Winston (Lamorne Morris); Jess's best friend Cece (Hannah Simone) also appears regularly. The characters, who are in their early thirties, deal with maturing relationships and career choices.

Production
New Girl was renewed for a sixth season on April 12, 2016. The season premiere marked Zooey Deschanel's directorial debut with the episode picking up three months after the events of the season five finale. TVLine confirmed Megan Fox's return midseason in an eight episode arc. At the 2016 Television Critics Association Summer Tour, FOX announced that this season would include a one-hour crossover with Brooklyn Nine-Nine, which aired on October 11. Only Deschanel appears on Brooklyn Nine-Nine, while Andy Samberg, Andre Braugher, Joe Lo Truglio and Chelsea Peretti appear on New Girl.

Cast and characters

Main cast
 Zooey Deschanel as Jessica "Jess" Day
 Jake Johnson as Nick Miller
 Max Greenfield as Schmidt
 Lamorne Morris as Winston Bishop
 Hannah Simone as Cece

Special guest cast
 Megan Fox as Reagan
Damon Wayans Jr. as Coach
Andy Samberg as Jake Peralta
Andre Braugher as Captain Raymond Holt
Chelsea Peretti as Gina Linetti
Joe Lo Truglio as Charles Boyle

Recurring cast
Curtis Armstrong as Principal Foster
Steve Agee as Outside Dave
Peter Gallagher as Gavin
Nasim Pedrad as Aly Nelson
Nelson Franklin as Robby
Rebecca Reid as Nadia
Trent Garrett as Donovan

Guest cast
Kate Flannery as Mary Ellen
Nora Dunn as Louise
David Hornsby as Ed Warner
Lucy Punch as Genevieve
Billy Gardell as Jason
Darlene Love as herself
Gillian Vigman as  Kim
Gordon Ramsay as himself
Sonequa Martin-Green as Rhonda
Jon Daly as Professor PP Hornsyld
Rob Reiner as  Bob Day
Olivia Rodrigo as Terrinea
Anna Maria Horsford as Charmaine
Donna Pescow as Priscilla
June Diane Raphael as Sadie
Brian Huskey as Merle Streep
Fred Willard as Beezus

Episodes

Notes

References

New Girl
2016 American television seasons
2017 American television seasons